İsmail Güven (born 16 April 1994) is a Turkish football player who plays as a midfielder for İskenderunspor in the TFF Second League.

Professional career
Güven signed his first contract with Konyaspor in 2011, and spent his early career on loan with various teams in the TFF First League and TFF Second League. He returned to Konyaspor, signing a contract on 8 January 2021. Güven made his professional debut with Konyaspor in a 2–1 Turkish Cup win over Gaziantep on 13 January 2021.

References

External links
 
 

1994 births
People from Meram
Living people
Turkish footballers
Turkey youth international footballers
Association football midfielders
Konyaspor footballers
1922 Konyaspor footballers
Denizlispor footballers
Şanlıurfaspor footballers
Altınordu F.K. players
Niğde Anadolu FK footballers
Zonguldakspor footballers
İskenderun FK footballers
Süper Lig players
TFF First League players
TFF Second League players
TFF Third League players